Akkur may refer to:
Akkur, Nagapattinam, a small Town in Nagapattinam district, Tamil Nadu, India
Akkur, Channapatna, a village in Bangalore Rural district, Karnataka, India
Akkur, Haveri, a village in Haveri district, Karnataka, India
Akkur, Ramanagaram, a village in Bangalore Rural district, Karnataka, India
Akkur, Tirumakudal Narsipur, a village in Mysore district, Karnataka, India
Akkur, Tiruvannamalai, a village in Thiruvannamalai district, Tamil Nadu, India